The Lady from Yesterday is a 1985 American made-for-television drama film directed  by Robert Day and starring Wayne Rogers and Bonnie Bedelia.

Plot
A man who has a wife and two daughters has everything he ever wanted: money, power and a great career. But then one day, his life turned upside down when a woman he had an affair with and has never seen since his army days in Vietnam showed up. She called him and asked him to caretake her son due to the fact that she is dying. Now he's risking & fighting for everything just to convince his current family & boss to take him in.

Cast 

 Wayne Rogers as  Craig Weston
 Bonnie Bedelia as Janet Weston
 Pat Hingle as Jim Bartlett
 Barrie Youngfellow as Rita Bartlett
  Blue Deckert as Sam Horton
 Bryan Price as Quan
 Tina Chen as Lien
 Ruth Kobart as Ida
 Paul Menzel as Howard Ames
  Nicole Benton  as Kimberly Weston
  KaRan Neff Reed as Abby Weston
 Beulah Quo as Mai Ling Luong

References

External links 

1985 films
1985 television films
American drama television films
Films scored by Mark Snow
Films directed by Robert Day
1980s English-language films